Glenorchy is a small settlement at the northern end of Lake Wakatipu in the South Island region of Otago, New Zealand. There are two pubs, a café and a range of small shops in the town catering mainly to tourists but also to the small resident population. There is also a small airstrip which caters to small planes.

The locality of Paradise is nearby. 

The Dart River / Te Awa Whakatipu and Rees River flow into the head of Lake Wakatipu next to Glenorchy.

Naming 
Glenorchy was named after Glen Orchy, a valley in Argyll, Scotland.

Demographics
Glenorchy is described by Statistics New Zealand as a rural settlement. It is part of the much larger Glenorchy statistical area.

Glenorchy settlement had a population of 318 at the 2018 New Zealand census, an increase of 57 people (21.8%) since the 2013 census, and an increase of 126 people (65.6%) since the 2006 census. There were 129 households. There were 159 males and 159 females, giving a sex ratio of 1.0 males per female, with 39 people (12.3%) aged under 15 years, 63 (19.8%) aged 15 to 29, 183 (57.5%) aged 30 to 64, and 33 (10.4%) aged 65 or older.

Ethnicities were 91.5% European/Pākehā, 6.6% Māori, 1.9% Pacific peoples, 3.8% Asian, and 3.8% other ethnicities (totals add to more than 100% since people could identify with multiple ethnicities).

Although some people objected to giving their religion, 69.8% had no religion, 21.7% were Christian, 0.9% were Buddhist and 2.8% had other religions.

Of those at least 15 years old, 75 (26.9%) people had a bachelor or higher degree, and 27 (9.7%) people had no formal qualifications. The employment status of those at least 15 was that 198 (71.0%) people were employed full-time, 36 (12.9%) were part-time, and 6 (2.2%) were unemployed.

Glenorchy statistical area

The statistical area had a population of 450 at the 2018 New Zealand census, an increase of 87 people (24.0%) since the 2013 census, and an increase of 177 people (64.8%) since the 2006 census. There were 177 households. There were 222 males and 225 females, giving a sex ratio of 0.99 males per female. The median age was 40.2 years (compared with 37.4 years nationally), with 51 people (11.3%) aged under 15 years, 84 (18.7%) aged 15 to 29, 261 (58.0%) aged 30 to 64, and 48 (10.7%) aged 65 or older.

Ethnicities were 92.0% European/Pākehā, 5.3% Māori, 2.0% Pacific peoples, 3.3% Asian, and 3.3% other ethnicities (totals add to more than 100% since people could identify with multiple ethnicities).

The proportion of people born overseas was 35.3%, compared with 27.1% nationally.

Although some people objected to giving their religion, 66.7% had no religion, 24.7% were Christian, 1.3% were Buddhist and 2.0% had other religions.

Of those at least 15 years old, 105 (26.3%) people had a bachelor or higher degree, and 36 (9.0%) people had no formal qualifications. The median income was $38,000, compared with $31,800 nationally. 69 people (17.3%) earned over $70,000 compared to 17.2% nationally. The employment status of those at least 15 was that 276 (69.2%) people were employed full-time, 60 (15.0%) were part-time, and 6 (1.5%) were unemployed.

Activities 
Glenorchy is a popular tourist spot, close to many tramping tracks. It lies near the borders of Mount Aspiring National Park and Fiordland National Park. The Routeburn Track, one of the New Zealand Great Walks can be accessed by passing through Glenorchy. Lesser known tracks such as the Greenstone and Caples Tracks and the Rees and Dart Tracks can also be accessed.

Some of the activities that can be experienced in or near Glenorchy include: canyoning, fly fishing, jet boating, horse riding, kayaking, mountain biking, skiing, snowboarding, skydiving and boating. Just past the Glenorchy Golf Club is a circular public boardwalk which passes through the Glenorchy Lagoon and is a popular short walk for tourists and locals.

Film location

Films
The local scenery was used as one of the settings in the first of Peter Jackson's The Fellowship of the Ring (2001), the first film in his Lord of the Rings series. Lothlórien, Orthanc, and the scene where Boromir was slain and leant near a tree were a few that were shot in nearby Paradise. 
Vertical Limit (2000), The Chronicles of Narnia: Prince Caspian (2008), and X-Men Origins: Wolverine (2009) were also filmed in the area. 
Other films that did location shots in Glenorchy and the surrounding area are Race for the Yankee Zephyr (1981) and The Water Horse (2007).

Television
The 2013 BBC television miniseries Top of the Lake was also filmed in the area and was set in and around Paradise. While Queenstown is referred to during the series, Glenorchy doubles as the fictitious town of Laketop.

Education

The first school in the area opened in 1884 at Kinloch, and another opened in 1888 on the road to Paradise. The present school opened near Buckleburn in 1911, and moved to its current site in 1939.

See also 
Glenorchy Air

References

External links 

Glenorchy Community Association

Populated places in Otago
Queenstown-Lakes District
Populated places on Lake Wakatipu